AppFuse provides a great project skeleton, similar to the one that's created by an IDE when one clicks through a "new web project" wizard. AppFuse 1.x uses Ant to create the project, as well as build/test/deploy it, whereas AppFuse 2.x uses Maven 2 for these tasks. IDE support was improved in 2.0 by leveraging Maven plugins to generate IDE project files. AppFuse 1.x uses XDoclet and JDK 1.4+.

AppFuse provides a project skeleton, similar to the one that's created by an IDE when one clicks through a "new web project" wizard. AppFuse 1.x uses Ant to create the project, as well as build/test/deploy it, whereas AppFuse 2.x uses Maven 2 for these tasks. IDE support was improved in 2.0 by leveraging Maven plugins to generate IDE project files. AppFuse 1.x uses XDoclet and JDK 1.4+. 

Unlike other "new project" wizards, the AppFuse wizard creates a number of additional classes and files that implement features, but also serve as examples for the developer.  The project is pre-configured to talk to a database, to deploy in an appserver, and to allow logging in.

When AppFuse was first developed, it only supported Struts and Hibernate. In version 2.x, it supports Hibernate, iBATIS or JPA as persistence frameworks.  For implementing the MVC model, AppFuse is compatible with JSF, Spring MVC, Struts 2 or Tapestry.

Features integrated into AppFuse includes the following:

 Authentication and Authorization
 User Management
 Remember Me (saving your login information so you don't have to log in every time)
 Password Reminder
 Signup/Registration
 SSL Switching
 E-Mail
 URL rewriting
 Skinnability
 Page Decoration
 Templated Layout
 File Upload

This out-of-the-box functionality is one of the main features in AppFuse that separates it from the other "CRUD Generation" frameworks, including Ruby on Rails and Grails. AppFuse is similar to Spring Roo in that both provide rapid productivity solutions for the Java programming language (whereas Grails and Ruby on Rails focus on other programming languages). The aforementioned frameworks, as well as AppFuse, allow you to create master/detail pages from database tables or existing model objects.

AppFuse has also been included in JBuilder.

The AppFuse project was shut down in April 2016. Its founder, Matt Raible, recommends using JHipster as an alternative.

References

Bibliography

 

Java enterprise platform
Web frameworks